This is a list of the first women lawyer(s) and judge(s) in Maine. It includes the year in which the women were admitted to practice law (in parentheses). Also included are women who achieved other distinctions such becoming the first in their state to graduate from law school or become a political figure.

Firsts in state history

Law School 

 First female law graduate: Velma Peabody in 1938

Lawyers 

First female: Clara Hapgood Nash (1872) 
First female (employed by Maine legislature): Gail Laughlin in 1913 
First female to argue case before Law Court: Alice Parker in 1932 
First female prosecutor: Suzanne E.K. Smith in 1972 
First Penobscot female: Jill E. Tompkins (1989) 
First Passamaquoddy female: Tina M. Farrenkopf (1997)  
First Wabanaki female: Sherri Mitchell:

State judges 

 First female (district court): Harriet Henry in 1973 
 First female (superior court): Jessie Briggs Gunther in 1976 
 First female (law court Maine Supreme Judicial Court): Caroline Duby Glassman in 1983 for the latter court 
 First female (Chief Justice; Maine Supreme Judicial Court): Leigh Saufley in 2001

Federal judges 
First female (federal judge): Margaret “Peggy” Kravchuk 
First female (U.S. District Court for the District of Maine): Nancy Torresen (1987) in 2011

Attorney General of Maine 

 First female: Janet Mills (c. 1976) in 2008

Deputy Attorney General 

 First female (Chief Deputy Attorney General of Maine): Vendean Vafiades

District Attorney 

 First female: Janet Mills (c. 1976) in 1980

Political Office 

First female (Governor of Maine): Janet Mills (c. 1976) in 2018 
First Latino American female (Deputy Secretary of State for Maine): Joann Bautista in 2021

United States Attorney 

 First female (interim): Paula D. Silsby in 2001 
 First female (permanent): Darcie N. McElwee in 2021

Maine State Bar Association 

 First female: Phyllis Givertz (1974) around 1983

Firsts in local history
 Janet Mills (c. 1976): First female to serve as a District Attorney in Androscoggin, Franklin and Oxford Counties, Maine (1980)
 Natasha Irving: First female District Attorney for Knox, Lincoln, Sagadahoc and Waldo Counties, Maine (2019)
 Jessie Briggs Gunther: First female to serve as a Judge of the Androscoggin County Superior Court, Maine
 Adeline Bond Rines (1914): First female lawyer in Cumberland County, Maine
Sigrid E. Tompkins: First female to serve as the President of the Cumberland County Bar Association, Maine (1974)
Stephanie Anderson: First female District Attorney for Cumberland County, Maine
Paula Sawyer: First female to graduate from the University of Maine School of Law (1968) [Cumberland County, Maine]
Agnes Robinson (1900): First female lawyer in Franklin County, Maine
Iola S. Kearney (1920): First female lawyer in Augusta, Maine [Kennebec County, Maine]
Shirley Cogswell: First female to serve as the Chief Justice of the Pleasant Point – Passamaquoddy Tribal Court (1980) [Washington County, Maine]

See also  
List of first women lawyers and judges in the United StatesTimeline of women lawyers in the United StatesWomen in law

Other topics of interest 

 List of first minority male lawyers and judges in the United States
 List of first minority male lawyers and judges in Maine

References 

Lawyers, Maine, first
Maine, first
Women, Maine, first
Women, Maine, first
Women in Maine
Lists of people from Maine
Maine lawyers